Laziše is a settlement in the Municipality of Laško in eastern Slovenia. It lies in hills south of Laško. The area is part of the traditional region of Styria. It is now included with the rest of the municipality in the Savinja Statistical Region.

The local parish church is dedicated to Saint Nicholas and belongs to the Roman Catholic Diocese of Celje. It was first mentioned in written documents dating to 1545.

References

External links
Laziše on Geopedia

Populated places in the Municipality of Laško